"Turn Your Back" is the first demo single by Billy Talent from their  third 
studio album, Billy Talent III. The song debuted live at The Norwegian Wood Festival in Oslo, Norway, on June 14, 2008 during their performance. Later performances of the song would be accompanied by Justin Sane and Chris #2 of Anti-Flag, who also appear as guest vocalists on the single. Lead singer Ben Kowalewicz told Kerrang!: "This is about being accountable for your actions - socially, politically and environmentally."

On August 27, 2008, the band posted a promotional poster for the single on their MySpace website.

Although not a promotional single for the third album (released almost a year before the album), the single was released as a charity stand-alone single on iTunes. The album version of it, however, does not feature the guest vocals of Anti-Flag's Justin Sane and Chris #2.

On September 2, 2008, on the Radio 1 Punk Show the song was played  for the first time. The song came out on iTunes on September 15, 2008. The single was officially released in Europe on September 12, 2008, and was also released in Canada, the US and France on September 16, 2008, and Australia on September 20, 2008. On the week of September 27, it debuted at number 23 on the Canadian Hot 100 chart on downloads alone.

The song was featured on the soundtrack of the NHL 09 video game.

Release history

Chart performance

References

External links
 Turn Your Back New Song 2008 Has Been Recorded, Billy Talent Official Website

2008 singles
Anti-Flag songs
Billy Talent songs
Anti-war songs
Protest songs
Song recordings produced by Brendan O'Brien (record producer)
Songs written by Ian D'Sa
Songs written by Benjamin Kowalewicz
Songs written by Jonathan Gallant
Songs written by Aaron Solowoniuk
2008 songs
Warner Records singles